Intel ADX (Multi-Precision Add-Carry Instruction Extensions) is Intel's arbitrary-precision arithmetic extension to the x86 instruction set architecture (ISA).  Intel ADX was first supported in the Broadwell microarchitecture.

The instruction set extension contains just two new instructions, though MULX from BMI2 is also considered as a part of the large integer arithmetic support.

Both instructions are more efficient variants of the existing ADC instruction, with the difference that each of the two new instructions affects only one flag, where ADC as a signed addition may set both overflow and carry flags, and as an old-style x86 instruction also reset the rest of the CPU flags.  Having two versions affecting different flags means that two chains of additions with carry can be calculated in parallel.

AMD added support in their processors for these instructions starting with Ryzen.

References

External links 
 
 

Intel
X86 instructions